The County of Nice National Football Team is a football team that represents the County of Nice. It is organized by the Countea de Nissa Football Association, established in April 2014. They are not affiliated with FIFA or UEFA, and therefore cannot compete for the FIFA World Cup or the UEFA European Championship.

The County of Nice Football Team won the 2014 ConIFA World Football Cup in Östersund, Sweden.

Tournament records

ConIFA World Football Cup record

ConIFA European Football Cup record

International record

Managers

References

External links 
County of Nice Football Association Official Homepage

Sport in Nice
CONIFA member associations
European national and official selection-teams not affiliated to FIFA
Football teams in France
2014 establishments in France
Sports organizations established in 2014
Football in Provence-Alpes-Côte d'Azur